Dourgne is a commune in the Tarn department and Occitanie region of southern France.

Demographics

Sites and monuments
Dourgne is known for its two Benedictine monasteries, the En Calcat Abbey and the Sainte Scholastique Abbey, both founded in 1890.

You can see the ruins of the Château de Castellas,  destroyed by Simon de Montfort.

See also
Communes of the Tarn department
List of Benedictine monasteries in France

References

External links

Dourgne 
Sainte Scholastique Abbey 
En Calcat Abbey 

Communes of Tarn (department)